Al Muqaraea is a village in Al Udayn District. It is located in the Ibb Governorate, According to the 2004 census it had a population of 52 people.

External links
Central Statistics Agency of the Republic of Yemen 
National Information Center in Yemen

References

Districts of Ibb Governorate